Dichagyris singularis is a moth of the family Noctuidae. It is found from Turkmenistan to south-eastern Turkey, parts of the Middle East, Jordan, Israel, Iran and Afghanistan.

Adults are on wing from September to January. There is one generation per year.

The larvae feed at night on low growing plants.

Subspecies
Dichagyris singularis singularis
Dichagyris singularis mesopotamica (Israel)

External links
 Noctuinae of Israel

singularis
Insects of Turkey
Moths of the Middle East
Moths described in 1892